Mohamed El-Messouti (born 15 October 1963) is a Syrian wrestler. He competed in the men's freestyle 48 kg at the 1988 Summer Olympics.

References

1963 births
Living people
Syrian male sport wrestlers
Olympic wrestlers of Syria
Wrestlers at the 1988 Summer Olympics
Place of birth missing (living people)
20th-century Syrian people